Dilly is a village and rural commune in the Cercle of Nara in the Koulikoro Region of south-western Mali. The commune includes 63 villages and in the 2009 census had a population of 38,965.

References

External links
.

Communes of Koulikoro Region